The Norwich AFL Rising Star award is given annually to a standout young player in the Australian Football League.

Eligibility
Every round, an Australian Football League rising star nomination is given to a standout young player. To be eligible for the award, a player must be under 21 on January 1 of that year, have played 10 or fewer senior games and not been suspended during the season. At the end of the year, one of the 22 nominees is the winner of award.  The nominated players from 1993 are considered to be one of the most successful of all years.

Nominations

References

External links
 

Afl Rising Star, 1993
Australian rules football-related lists